This is a list of flag bearers who have represented Tonga at the Olympics.

Flag bearers carry the national flag of their country at the opening ceremony of the Olympic Games.

See also
Tonga at the Olympics

References

Flagbearers
Tonga
Olympic flagbearers